Józef Ciszewski (born 12 January 1904 in Kraków, died 1987 in Warsaw) was a football forward who played for several Polish clubs and made 14 appearances for the Poland national football team, scoring 3 goals.

Career
Ciszewski started career in Cracovia in 1920. Later moved to Warsaw, to play in Legia Warsaw and Polonia Warsaw, but also in early 1930s returned to Cracovia, where in 1932 won Championship of Poland.

References

1904 births
1987 deaths
Polish footballers
Poland international footballers
MKS Cracovia (football) players
Footballers from Kraków
Association football forwards
Legia Warsaw players
Polonia Warsaw players